The Texas Forensic Association (TFA) is an organization that provides and regulates competition in speech and debate (forensics) for Texas high school students. The association authorizes forensics competitions nearly every weekend in Texas for the duration of the forensics season, which lasts from early August until the end of February, with the State competition typically in the first or second week of March.

Goals
The Texas Forensic Association states that its goals are:
to foster cooperation between the worlds of speech and theatre
to show the importance of speech and theatre education to the public
to create a forum to collaborate and solve common problems in the speech and theatre fields
to forward the standards of the speech and theatre activities
to promote cooperation and friendship among students and teachers in the organization

Regions
TFA divides Texas into five regions for administrative purposes; there are no regional championship tournaments or limit on number of schools or students to qualify to the state tournament from each region. The regions are divided by area code, and there is a region representative from each region to coordinate the region's activities with the state association.
Region 1 covers the Texas panhandle, area code 806. The Region 1 representative is Ryan Lovell of Tascosa High School. 
Region 2 covers Northeast Texas, including the Dallas-Fort Worth metro area. The area codes included are 214, 254, 469, 682, 817, 903, 940, and 972. The Region 2 representative is Rhonda Smith of Plano West Senior High School.
Region 3 covers South Texas, including the San Antonio and Austin metro areas. The area codes included are 210, 361, 512, 830, and 956. The Region 3 representative is Davy Holmes of Dripping Springs High School. 
Region 4 covers East Texas. It is the smallest region and mainly encompasses the Houston metro area. The area codes included are 281, 409, 713, 832, 936, and 979. The Region 4 representative is Ryan Hennessey of Cypress-Fairbanks ISD.
Region 5 covers West Texas, area code 915, 432, and part of 325. It is the largest geographical region, spanning close to 550 miles across.  The Region 5 representative is Yolanda Silva of Franklin High School.

Events offered

State qualifying events
Policy Debate (Cross-Examination, CX, Policy): Debate between two teams of two students on a question of policy, which remains the same for the competitive season
Lincoln-Douglas Debate (LD, Value Debate): Debate between two students on a question of values or morality, which changes every two months
Public Forum Debate (PF, Ted Turner Debate, Puff, PoFo): Debate between two teams of two students in which each team accepts or rejects a position
Foreign Extemporaneous Speaking (Foreign Extemp, FX): A 7-minute extemporaneous speech on a foreign current events topic
Domestic Extemporaneous Speaking (Domestic Extemp, DX): A 7-minute extemporaneous speech on a domestic current events topic
Original Oratory (Oratory, OO): A 10-minute memorized speech on a topic of the student's choosing
Informative Speaking (Informative, INFO, INF): A 10-minute memorized speech on a topic of the students choosing with the help of non-electric visual aids
Humorous Interpretation (Humorous, Humor, HI): A 10-minute memorized humorous presentation of a published work
Dramatic Interpretation (Dramatic, DI): A 10-minute memorized dramatic presentation of a published work
Duet Acting (Duet, DA): A 10-minute scene from a published work, presented by a team of two students
Duo Interpretation (Duo): A 10-minute memorized presentation of a published work, presented by a team of two students
Congressional Debate (Congress, Student Congress): A mock congress session where students make speeches and motions on a set of given legislation
World Schools Debate (WS, WSD): A style of debate popular in Australia and Asia, where teams of 3-5 debate upon a set of given motions, which center around principled value and practicality

Non-qualifying events
These events are held during the TFA State Consolation Rounds.

In addition to the events that can qualify a student to the State Tournament, some tournaments also offer:
Prose Interpretation: A 7-minute non-memorized presentation of a published piece of prose
Poetry Interpretation: A 7-minute non-memorized presentation of a published piece of poetry
Impromptu Speaking: A 5-minute impromptu speech on one of three topics, usually including pop culture references/ more lighthearted options that the other speaking events.

State Tournament
The competitive season culminates in the TFA State Tournament, a three-day event held at a different Texas school each year. Competition in all qualifying events is offered, and non-qualifying events are offered as consolation events for students who did not advance in the event they qualified in. 
 The 2008 TFA State Tournament was held March 6–8 at Coppell High School, Dallas, Texas.
 The 2009 TFA State Tournament was held March 5–7 at Cypress Ranch High School, in Houston, Texas.
 The 2010 TFA State Tournament was held March 10–13 at Hanks High School in El Paso, Texas.
 The 2011 TFA State Tournament was held March 10–12 at Flower Mound High School in Flower Mound, Texas
 The 2012 TFA State Tournament was held on March 1–3 at Amarillo High School in Amarillo, Texas.
 The 2013 TFA State Tournament was held on March 7–9 at South Grand Prairie High School in Dallas, Texas
 The 2014 TFA State Tournament was held on March 6–8 at Cypress Creek High School in Houston, Texas
 The 2015 TFA State Tournament was held on March 5-7 at Franklin High School in El Paso, Texas
 The 2016 TFA State Tournament was held on March 10-12 at Hendrickson High School in Pflugerville, Texas
 The 2017 TFA State Tournament was held on March 9-11 at Plano West Senior High School in Plano, Texas
 The 2018 TFA State Tournament was held on March 1-3 at La Vernia High School, La Vernia Junior High School, La Vernia Intermediate School, La Vernia Primary School in La Vernia, Texas
The 2019 TFA State Tournament was held on March 14-16 at Alief Taylor High School in Houston, Texas (Region 4).
The 2020 TFA State Tournament was held March 5-7 at Franklin High School in El Paso, Texas (Region 5).
The 2021 TFA State Tournament was held March 10-13 through a virtual learning campus.
The 2022 TFA State Tournament was held March 9-12 at Gregory-Portland High School in Portland, Texas (Region 4).
The 2023 TFA State Tournament will be held in March at the Marriott Westchase hotel in Houston, Texas (Region 4).

Points system
To qualify for State in a certain event, a student must accumulate twelve state points in the event. Points are awarded based on the number of entries in the tournament. 
Cross Examination Debate, Lincoln-Douglas Debate, and Public Forum Debate
10-15 entries: Semis gets 2 points, 2nd Place gets 4, and 1st Place gets 6
16-50 entries: Quarters gets 2, Semis gets 4, 2nd Place gets 6, and 1st Place gets 8
51-75 entries: Octos gets 2, Quarters gets 3, Semis gets 6, and 1st/2nd Place gets 8
76 + entries: Double-Octos gets 1, Octos gets 2, Quarters gets 4, Semis gets 6, and 1st/2nd Place gets 8
Individual Events (including Duo/Duet)
10-24 entries: 1st Place gets 6, 2nd Place gets 4, 3rd Place gets 3, 4th Place gets 2, 5th/6th Place gets 1 point
25-50 entries: 1st Place gets 8, 2nd Place gets 6, 3rd Place gets 4, 4th Place gets 3, 5th Place gets 2, 6th Place gets 1 point
51-75 entries: 1st/2nd Place gets 8, 3rd/4th Place gets 6, 5th Place gets 4, 6th Place gets 3, 7th Place gets 2, 8th Place gets 1 point
76 + entries: 1st/2nd Place gets 8, 3rd/4th Place gets 6, 5th Place gets 4, 6th Place gets 3, 7th/8th Place gets 2, any and all semifinalists get 1 point
Congressional Debate
10-25 entries: 1st Place gets 6, 2nd Place gets 4, 3rd Place gets 3, 4th Place get 2, and 5th/6th Place gets 1
26-50 entries: 1st Place gets 8, 2nd Place gets 6, 3rd/4th Place gets 4, 5th-8th Place gets 2
51-75 entries: 1st/2nd Place gets 8, 2nd/3rd Place gets 6, 5th-8th Place gets 3, 9th-16th gets 2
76 + entries: 1st/2nd Place gets 8, 2nd/3rd Place gets 6, 5th-8th Place gets 4, 9th-16th gets 2, all semi-finalists get 1

State winners
2017 Tournament
Policy (CX) Debate: Liberal Arts and Sciences Academy
Lincoln-Douglas Debate: Saavan Nanavati, Westwood High School
Public Forum Debate: Miranda Nutt/Marina Leventis, Colleyville Heritage High School
Congressional Debate (House): Spencer Buckner, Lake Travis High School
Congressional Debate (Senate): John Osho, George Ranch High School
Foreign Extemporaneous Speaking: Sarah Lanier, Northland Christian School
Domestic Extemporaneous Speaking: Katherine Hu, Plano Senior High School
Original Oratory: Ariana Uriah Okhuozagbon, J. Frank Dobie High School
Humorous Interpretation: Andy VanSaders, Saginaw High School
Dramatic Interpretation: Taylor Woods, Grand Prairie High School
Duet Acting: Heaslip/Martinez, Lake Travis High School
Duo Interpretation: Gayton/Nunez, Ronald Reagan High School
Poetry: Shade Smith, Judson High School Theatre Arts
Prose: Sarah Skees, John Paul II High School
Impromptu Speaking: Gabriella Ghandour, Lubbock High School
Informative Speaking: Anna Olivia Speed, W.B. Ray High School
Program Oral Interpretation: Alfredo Antu, Central High School
CX Top Speaker Award: Elan Wilson, Hendrickson High School
LD Top Speaker Award: Lucas Clarke, Cypress Woods High School
PF Top Speaker Award: Jacob Tate, Bellaire High School

2016 Tournament
Policy (CX) Debate: Crayton Gerst/Vernon Johnson, Law Magnet High School
Lincoln-Douglas Debate: Bennett Eckert, Greenhill School (Triple Champion)
Public Forum Debate: Franz Brotzen/John Vick, Lamar High School
Congressional Debate (House): Usmaan Hasan, Plano West Senior High School
Congressional Debate (Senate): Angela Lytle, Cinco Ranch High School
Foreign Extemporaneous Speaking: Neil Patel, Plano West Senior High School
Domestic Extemporaneous Speaking: Marshall Webb, Saint Mary's Hall (Double Champion)
Original Oratory: Usmaan Hasan, Plano West Senior High School
Humorous Interpretation: Ryan Esparza, Klein High School
Dramatic Interpretation: Jaylon Bolden, J. Frank Dobie High School
Duet Acting: Frizzell/McIver, Central High School
Duo Interpretation: Ramirez/Diaz, Spring Woods High School
Poetry: Julie Juekeng, Cypress Lakes High School

2015 Tournament
Policy (CX) Debate: Alex Estrada/Joseph Estrada, Stephen F. Austin High School
Lincoln-Douglas Debate: Bennett Eckert, Greenhill School (Double Champion)
Public Forum Debate: Austin Tang/Joshua Yang, Clements High School
Congressional Debate (House): Eric Bailey, Bellaire High School
Congressional Debate (Senate): Preston Nieves, Pflugerville High School
Foreign Extemporaneous Speaking: Abhinav Sridharan, Plano Senior High School (Double Champion)
Domestic Extemporaneous Speaking: Marshall Webb, St. Mary's Hall
Original Oratory: Nikki Dargahi, Anderson High School
Humorous Interpretation: Seis Steves, St. Mary's Hall
Dramatic Interpretation: Bianca Montgomery, Andy Dekaney High School
Duet Acting: Schwope/McDonald, Robert E. Lee High School
Duo Interpretation: Velazquez/Ocampo, South Grand Prairie High School
Poetry: Matthew Almaguer, Harlingen South High School
Prose: Amani Abderahman, Garland High School
Impromptu Speaking: Gage Krause, Lake Travis High School
CX Top Speaker Award: Alex Estrada, Stephen F. Austin High School
LD Top Speaker Award: Nolan Burdett, Dulles High School
PF Top Speaker Award: Samuel Tekie, Lamar High School

2014 Tournament
Policy Debate: Emma Pabst/Quaram Robinson, Cedar Ridge High School
Lincoln-Douglas Debate: Bennett Eckert, Greenhill School
Public Forum Debate: David Ratnoff/Gregory Ross, Houston Lamar High School
Congressional Debate (House): Daniella Cohen, Southlake Carroll High School
Congressional Debate (Senate): Sankalp Singh, Plano Senior High School
Foreign Extemporaneous Speaking: Abhinav Sridharan, Plano Senior High School
Domestic Extemporaneous Speaking: Ash Malhotra, Plano Senior High School
Original Oratory: Sana Moti, Grapevine High School
Humorous Interpretation: John Biebighauser, Grapevine High School
Dramatic Interpretation: Abigail Onwunali, Alief Hastings High School
Duet Acting: Hansen/Lawson, Guyer High School
Duo Interpretation: Steves/Barnett, Saint Mary's Hall
Poetry: Alonna Ray, Centennial High School
Prose: Carly Suhr, Centennial High School
Impromptu Speaking: Sagar Segal, Summit International Preparatory
CX Top Speaker Award: Quaram Robinson, Cedar Ridge High School
LD Top Speaker Award: Shania Hunt, Northland Christian School
PF Top Speaker Award: Nazifa Mim, Cypress Falls High School

Individual Sweepstakes Awards
5th Place: Kayla McGee, Flower Bluff High School (36 points)
4th Place: Gregory Ross, Houston Lamar High School (40 points)
3rd Place: Seis Steves, Saint Mary's Hall (41 points)
2nd Place: Ash Malhotra, Plano Senior High School (45 points)
1st Place: Sana Moti, Grapevine High School (45 points)

Regional Sweepstakes
Region 1: Hereford High School
Region 2: Plano Senior High School
Region 3: Harlingen South High School
Region 4: Houston Lamar High School
Region 5: San Angelo Central High School

Overall Sweepstakes
10th Place: St. Mary's Hall
9th Place: Guyer High School
8th Place: Centennial High School
7th Place: Houston Lamar High School
6th Place: Plano West High School
5th Place: Southlake Carroll High School
4th Place: Harlingen South High School
3rd Place: Creekview High School
2nd Place: Grapevine High School
1st Place: Plano Senior High School

2013 Tournament 
Policy Debate: Holmes Hampton/Tyler Shearer, Highland Park High School
Lincoln-Douglas Debate: Rebecca Kuang, Greenhill School
Public Forum Debate: Sahil Vanjani/Cyrus Ghaznavi, Parish Episcopal School
Congressional Debate (House): Diane Sun, Clements High School
Congressional Debate (Senate): Blake Seaman, Allen High School
Duet Acting: Dakota Ratliff/Cody Vann, Ryan High School
Duo Interpretation: Keith Machekanyanga/Chris Jefferson, South Grand Prairie High School
Humorous Interpretation: Michael Ferguson, Creekview High School
Dramatic Interpretation: Aldean Pearson II, Mansfield High School
Original Oratory: Billy Tate, Plano Senior High School
Foreign Extemporaneous: Cyrus Ghaznavi, Parish Episcopal School
Domestic Extemporaneous: Drew Huegel, Lamar Consolidated High School
Prose: Cody Eilrich, North Lamar High School
Impromptu Speaking: John William VanDerSchans, Centennial High School
Poetry: Mahalia Tutuwaa Agyepong, Hightower High School
Policy Top Speaker: Zach Rosenthal, Kinkaid School
LD Top Speaker: Jeremy Dang, Strake Jesuit College Preparatory
PF Top Speaker: Kartik Sridhar, Plano Senior High School

2012 Tournament
Policy Debate: Rosenthal/Mitchell, Kinkaid High School
Lincoln-Douglas Debate: Amyn Kassam, John Foster Dulles High School
Public Forum Debate: Diep/Daniels, Isaac Herbert Kempner High School
Foreign Extemporaneous Speaking: Arvind Venkataraman, Southlake Carroll High School 
Domestic Extemporaneous Speaking: Zachary Stone, Plano West High School 
Original Oratory: Paige LaNasa, Centennial High School
Humorous Interpretation: Marah Wilson, Grapevine High School
Dramatic Interpretation: Robert Jackson, Alief Hastings High School
Duet Acting: Weston/Torres, Grand Prairie High School
Duo Interpretation: Hunt/Waller, Mansfield High School.

2011 Tournament
Policy Debate: Gorman/McCormick, Jesuit College Prep
Lincoln-Douglas Debate: Josh Roberts, Northland Christian
Public Forum Debate: Garg/Narayanan, Plano Senior High School
Foreign Extemporaneous Speaking: Lavanya Sunder, Lamar High School 
Domestic Extemporaneous Speaking: Shikha Garg, Plano Senior High School 
Original Oratory: Michael McBride, Plano Senior High School
Humorous Interpretation: Tommy Waas, Klein High School
Dramatic Interpretation: Keegan Latham, Plano Senior High School
Duet Acting: Rutherford/Tope, Plano Senior High School
Duo Interpretation: Flores/Martinez, Grand Prairie High School.

Scholarship
The TFA awards a scholarship of $500 or $1,000 to two male and two female students each year at the state tournament. Any state-qualified senior may apply with a recommendation from his or her coach. The awards are given based on an equally weighted consideration of achievements, financial need, and academics.

References

External links
 Official website
 National Forensic League: official website

Policy debate
Student debating societies
Public speaking organizations